Never Never Land is the 1971 debut album by the UK underground group Pink Fairies.

Polydor Records commissioned the group to record a single, "The Snake"/"Do It", and were happy enough with the results to offer the group an album contract. A promotional film was recorded for the single on the set of Oliver!, but the single was omitted from this debut album. The b-side, "Do It", did appear but with added overdubs. "Do It" was later covered by the Henry Rollins Band on their Do It album.

The sleeve came in a printed PVC cover, with an inner gatefold sleeve depicting two different scenescapes, and a printed inner sleeve with a photograph of the band.

200 copies were also pressed on pink vinyl the same year. Initial pressings properly credited the full band as songwriters on all songs. However, John Alder worked a deal with a different publisher that resulted in songwriting credits and royalties being erroneously awarded to him for "Heavenly Man", "War Girl", "Thor", and "The Dream is Just Beginning" on later pressings.

Track listing 
 All Songs Copyright Polydor Music Ltd.
 "Do It" (Pink Fairies) - 4:15
 "Heavenly Man" (Alder) - 3:41
 "Say You Love Me" (Pink Fairies) - 3:48
 "War Girl" (Alder) - 4:34
 "Never Never Land" (Pink Fairies) - 6:55
 "Track One, Side Two" (Pink Fairies) - 4:41
 "Thor" (Alder) - 0:58
 "Teenage Rebel" (Pink Fairies) - 5:20
 "Uncle Harry's Last Freak-Out" (Pink Fairies) - 10:51
 "The Dream Is Just Beginning" (Alder) - 1:18

2002 CD Bonus Tracks 
 "The Snake" (Pink Fairies) - 3:58
 "Do It" (Single version) (Pink Fairies) - 3:04
 "War Girl" (Alternate extended mix) (Alder) - 4:34
 "Uncle Harry's Last Freak-Out" (First version) (Alder) - 12:24

Personnel 
Pink Fairies
 Paul Rudolph – guitar, vocals
 Duncan Sanderson – bass
 Russell Hunter – drums
 Twink – drums, vocals

Production 
 Produced by Pink Fairies & Neil Slaven
 Recorded & Engineered by Andy Hendriksen & Gary Lyons
Pennie Smith, Tony Vesely - sleeve design

References

External links 
 Collectable Records - Original cover
 "Never Never Land" at discogs-click on "more images" for production credits

1971 debut albums
Pink Fairies albums
Polydor Records albums